The 71st edition of the KNVB Cup started on October 1, 1988. The final was played on May 25, 1989: PSV beat FC Groningen 4–1 and won the cup for the fifth time.

Teams
 All 18 participants of the Eredivisie 1988-89
 All 19 participants of the Eerste Divisie 1988-89
 27 teams from lower (amateur) leagues

First round
The matches of the first round were played on October 1 and 2, 1988.

E Eredivisie; 1 Eerste Divisie; A Amateur teams

Second round
The matches of the second round were played on November 18, 19 and 20, 1988.

Round of 16
The matches of the round of 16 were played between February 1 and 15, 1989.

Quarter finals
The quarter finals were played between March 8 and March 15, 1989.

Semi-finals
The semi-finals were played on April 12, 1989.

Final

PSV also won the Dutch Eredivisie championship, thereby taking the double. They would participate in the European Cup, so finalists FC Groningen could play in the Cup Winners' Cup.

See also
 Eredivisie 1988-89
 Eerste Divisie 1988-89

External links
 Netherlands Cup Full Results 1970–1994 by the RSSSF

1988-89
1988–89 domestic association football cups
1988–89 in Dutch football